Biribi is a 1922 Austrian silent film directed by Hans Steinhoff and starring Hugo Werner-Kahle.

References

Bibliography
Elisabeth Büttner & Christian Dewald. Das tägliche Brennen: eine Geschichte des österreichischen Films von den Anfängen bis 1945, Volume 1. Residenz, 2002.

External links

1922 films
Austrian silent feature films
Films directed by Hans Steinhoff
Austrian black-and-white films